Daphna is a given name. Notable people with the name include:

 Daphna Dove (born 1975), American musician
 Daphna Greenstein (born 1952), Israeli landscape architect
 Daphna Kastner (born 1961), Canadian actress, screenwriter and director
 Daphna Oyserman American-Israeli Professor of Psychology
Daphna Poznanski-Benhamou (born 1950), French politician

See also 

 Daphne (given name)

Feminine given names